Koo Bon-moo (10 February 1945 – 20 May 2018) was a South Korean business executive, who gained worldwide fame as the renamer and business executive of the LG Group.

Early life
Born on 10 February 1945 in Jinju, South Gyeongsang Province, Koo enrolled at Yonsei University. He moved to Ohio and completed his bachelor's and master's degrees at Ashland University and Cleveland State University, respectively.

Business career 
Upon graduation from Cleveland State University, Koo returned to South Korea in 1975 and began working for Lucky Chemical, which later became LG Chem. He was transferred to GoldStar in 1980, and from 1983 to 1985, headed the company's Tokyo office. In 1995, Koo succeeded his father Koo Cha-kyung, the oldest son of LG's founder Koo In-hwoi as chairman of LG Group because of the Koo family's “male-only succession rule".  Koo Bon-moo adopted his nephew Koo Kwang-mo in 2004, after losing his only son in 1994. Starting in 2017, Koo Bon-moo sought continual treatment for a brain tumor. He eventually ended medical treatment, and died in Seoul on 20 May 2018, aged 73.

References

1947 births
2018 deaths
South Korean billionaires
South Korean business executives
20th-century South Korean businesspeople
21st-century South Korean businesspeople
People from Jinju
Yonsei University alumni
Cleveland State University alumni
Ashland University alumni
Deaths from brain cancer in South Korea
LG Corporation
FC Seoul directors and chairmen
South Korean Buddhists